Kieran Barton is a retired English-American soccer player who played professionally in the USL A-League.

Player
Barton, son of English footballer Frank Barton, went to the United States in 1979 when his father signed with the Seattle Sounders of the North American Soccer League. Frank Barton remained in the United States after his retirement from professional football and Kieran Barton graduated from Mount Si High School in Snoqualmie, Washington. He attended Whitworth College in Spokane, Washington, playing on the men's soccer team from 1989 to 1993. He graduated in 1993 with bachelor's degree in biology.

In 1994, Barton turned professional with the Seattle Sounders of the American Professional Soccer League.  In 1995, he again played for the Sounders as they won the league championship.  In 1996, Barton moved to the Spokane Shadow of the USISL Premier League, beginning a pattern of alternating between the Sounders and the Shadow.  In 1997, Barton returned to the Sounders only to turn around and return to the Shadow in 1998.  In 1999, Barton again signed with the Sounders, this time for the next four seasons.  In 2003, Barton again joined the Spokane Shadow where he finished his playing career in 2005.

Coach
In 2002, Barton became an assistant coach with the Gonzaga University women's team, a position he held until 2007. In 2004, he also became an assistant with the Spokane Shadow. In April 2005, he was elevated the position of head coach of the Shadow.

External links
 Crossfire Premier: Kieran Barton

References

Living people
1971 births
American soccer players
American Professional Soccer League players
A-League (1995–2004) players
Seattle Sounders (1994–2008) players
Spokane Shadow players
USL League Two players
Association football defenders
Association football midfielders